The Christmas Hurricane of 1902 was a strong European windstorm which struck Denmark and Sweden on 25 December 1902.

In Sweden, it hit Scania, parts of southern Kronoberg County and the west coast of Sweden. Circa 50 fishermen were killed, while very few people on land were killed. Material damages, were measured in millions of Swedish crowns as of 1902, were reported. The storm destroyed, among other things, open-air baths in Varberg, Mölle and Malmö (one in Ribersborgsstranden - the Ribersborgs open-air bath, and one in Sibbarp), and the Örgryte Church tower spire fell off.

References

1902 natural disasters
1902 in Denmark
1902 in Sweden
1902 disasters in Denmark
1902 disasters in Sweden
European windstorms
Weather events in Denmark
Weather events in Sweden
Winter weather events
December 1902 events